RFA Derwentdale (A114) was a Dale-class fleet tanker and landing ship (gantry) of the Royal Fleet Auxiliary. She served during the Second World War.

She was taken over by the Admiralty and completed as a Landing Ship Gantry. As such, 15 LCMs could be carried on the ships, with two Gantry cranes, one forward of the ship's bridge and one aft, used to lift the landing craft off the deck and lower them to the sea. with accommodation for 150 military personnel.

Service
Derwentdale took part in the British invasion of Madagascar in 1942, leaving Durban, South Africa on 25 May 1942, and contributing 14 landing craft for the landings at Diego Suarez on 5 May. In November 1942, the British and Americans landed in French North Africa in Operation Torch, with Derwentdale taking part in the landings at Arzew near Oran in Algeria on 9 November. She later took part in the invasions of Sicily and Italy. She was damaged by bombing at Salerno and towed to the UK via Malta to be re-engined with engines from the Denbydale. She returned to service as a tanker in 1946, her extra accommodation was used for passengers whilst freighting oil on the Trinidad to UK run. She was decommissioned on 19 May 1959 and was laid up at Rosyth.

References 

Dale-class oilers
Tankers of the Royal Fleet Auxiliary
1941 ships
Ships built in Govan
Ships built by Harland and Wolff